The Wind in the Willows is a 1987 American animated musical television film directed by Arthur Rankin, Jr. and Jules Bass, co-founders of Rankin/Bass Productions in New York, New York. It is an adaptation of Kenneth Grahame's 1908 novel The Wind in the Willows. Set in a pastoral version of England, the film focuses on four anthropomorphised animal characters (Moley, Ratty, Mr. Toad, and Mr. Badger) and contains themes of mysticism, adventure, morality, and camaraderie. The film features the voices of Charles Nelson Reilly, Roddy McDowall, José Ferrer, and Eddie Bracken. The screenplay was written by Romeo Muller, a long-time Rankin/Bass writer whose work included Rudolph the Red-Nosed Reindeer (1964),  Frosty the Snowman (1969), The Hobbit (1977), and  The Flight of Dragons (1982), among others. The film's animation was outsourced to James C.Y. Wang's Cuckoo's Nest Studios (also known as Wang Film Productions) in Taipei, Taiwan.

This was the last project produced by Rankin/Bass before the company was shut down on March 4, 1987. The film was finished in 1983 and released on video in the UK in November of that year, but its US television premiere was delayed several times, before finally airing July 5, 1987 on ABC. In this version, the horse pulling the barge is the same horse who pulls Mr. Toad's caravan, Portly is Badger's nephew, and The Piper at the Gates of Dawn and Wayfarer's All chapters are included, although the events of Wayfarer's All occurs before the events of The Piper at the Gates of Dawn, and Ratty actually leaves the Riverbank, only to be found later by Mole (alongside Portly).

Rankin/Bass had previously produced a television show with the Wind in the Willows characters in 1970, The Reluctant Dragon & Mr. Toad Show, with the voices of Canadian actors Paul Soles, Donna Miller, Claude Rae and Carl Banas, the production artwork of Paul Coker, Jr., and the animation of Osamu Tezuka's Mushi Production in Tokyo, Japan.

Plot 
The "well-known and popular" Mr. Toad of Toad Hall (voice of Charles Nelson Reilly), a conceited and impulsive animal, embarks on a madcap river voyage in a paddleboat, nearly shipwrecking his friend Ratty (voiced with affection by Roddy McDowall) who is out for a leisurely row. At the same time, Toad whelms the entrance to the subterranean home of Moley (voice of Eddie Bracken). So disturbed, Moley comes above ground for the first time in his life, and is positively amazed by the surface world. At once he meets Ratty, who invites him to come along on his river cruise ("Wind in the Willows"). All too soon, Toad returns and recklessly overturns Ratty's boat, nearly drowning Moley, but Ratty saves him and pushes him along to shore.

Ratty, not taking kindly to interference of nature, resolves to have it out with Toad, and he and Moley paddle down the river together ("Messing Around in Boats"). On the way downriver to Toad Hall, they pass Badger (voice of José Ferrer), who is tending his land on the riverbank. Despite their friendly greetings, Badger gruffly reminds them that he is not the most social of animals and retreats. At Toad Hall, Ratty and Moley find that Toad (true to his form) has tired of boating and instead developed an appetite for overnight wagoneering. Not one to take no for an answer, Toad invites them to come along on his first trip, but Moley and Ratty find that he has planned the journey with complete disregard to packing food and drink ("We Don't Have Any Paté de Foie Gras"). Toad shrugs off the criticism. The next day, their wagon is almost wrecked by a passing motorcar while the horse runs away and gets lost, inspiring Toad to forget wagoneering and turn his undivided attention to motoring. Within days of buying his first car ("Messing Around in Cars"), his reckless driving demolishes it ("Mr. Toad").

Nearing winter, Moley wishes to visit Badger in spite of Ratty's remonstrations. While Ratty dozes, Moley slips out to brave the Wild Wood and attempt to call on Badger. But as he walks through the Wild Wood, his imagination gets the better of him; perceiving evil faces in the trees all around him, he is frightened into hiding. Ratty eventually finds him, but heading for home, they lose their way in falling snow. By pure chance they happen upon Badger's front door, and although Badger is at first annoyed by their call ("I Hate Company"), he has a change of heart and welcomes them in when he recognises them as friends.

Badger hears of Toad's automotive antics from Ratty and Moley and resolves to do something about it come spring. When Toad still refuses to listen to reason after a quite intense confrontation with an accompanying thunderstorm, Badger orders him locked in his bedroom until he comes to his senses. Nonetheless, Toad still longs for the open road ("Messing Around in Cars Reprise"), and tricks Ratty into leaving him alone in the house. He secretly escapes his exile, makes his way to a nearby village and promptly makes off with another motorcar, which he just as promptly wrecks. After insulting a responding police officer, Toad is taken to court and sentenced to 20 years in prison ("Guilty!") for his offenses.

Fortunately for Toad, the warden's daughter takes pity on him and helps him escape in the guise of a washerwoman. At first hitching a ride on a train, Toad finds the police in hot pursuit but is aided in his getaway by the engine driver. His next reprieve comes from a barge woman, but when he bungles a load of laundry, he rudely reveals himself to the barge woman and finds himself back on the road with his old caravan horse. There he encounters the very same motorcar whose theft landed him in prison; but in his disguise he fools the owners into letting him drive again. Lesson still not learned, he loses control of the car and barely survives.

In the meantime, Ratty, unaware of Toad's escape, writes him a letter detailing the takeover of Toad Hall by Wild Wood animals, principally weasels. While describing the ruin wrought on Toad Hall ("A Party That Never Ceases"), Ratty hears the news about Toad from Badger. Not long thereafter, an old wayfarer visits Ratty and tells him all about the world beyond the riverbank. Overcome with wanderlust, Ratty follows him, but aborts his adventure when he finds Badger's young nephew Portly lost in the woods. Moley finds them at the same time as Badger finds Toad washed up on the riverbank, ostensibly with the help of a mystical wood-spirit called Pan.

As part of the scheme to retake Toad Hall, Moley calls upon the stoats guarding the gate, using Toad's washerwoman disguise. He vastly exaggerates the battle plan, fooling the stoats into thinking that overwhelming forces are advancing on Toad Hall. That night, Badger, Ratty, Moley and Toad sneak into Toad Hall via an old secret tunnel. Aided by the fear of Moley's warning, they deceive the weasels into surrendering and successfully reclaim Toad Hall. In private, he prepares a rousing speech despite the friends dissuading him from doing so ("Mr. Toad Reprise"). That night, the forest animals have a banquet at Toad Hall celebrating their liberation from the weasels, but Toad does not do anything to brag. Later, when sitting by a fireplace before Badger, Moley, and Ratty, Toad says his plans to make restitution to all he wronged as well as a new credo of friendship and charity, assuring his friends he has indeed repented.

Cast 
 Charles Nelson Reilly as Mr. Toad 
 Roddy McDowall as Ratty 
 José Ferrer as Mr. Badger 
 Eddie Bracken as Moley 
 Paul Frees as Wayfarer 
 Robert McFadden as Magistrate 
 Ray Owens as Clerk of the Court 
 Gerry Matthews as Jailer 
 Ron Marshall Additional voices
 Alice Tweedie as Washerwoman 
 Jeryl Jagoda as Additional voices

Music

References

External links

See also 

 The Wind in the Willows (1983 film)  
 Wind in the Willows (1988 film)  
 The Wind in the Willows (1995 film)
 The Wind in the Willows (1996 film)
 The Wind in the Willows (1999 film)

1987 films
1987 animated films
1987 television films
1980s American animated films
1980s musical films
American children's animated musical films
Films scored by Maury Laws
Animated films based on children's books
Animated films about frogs
Films about mice and rats
Films about badgers
Films based on The Wind in the Willows
Films directed by Arthur Rankin Jr.
Films directed by Jules Bass
Rankin/Bass Productions films
Animated films based on novels
1980s children's animated films
Films with screenplays by Romeo Muller
Animated films about rats
Television shows based on The Wind in the Willows
Films about weasels